List of rivers flowing in the island of Java, Indonesia.

In alphabetical order

Mouth location
The following list groups the rivers by the direction of the flow: the west, north, south or east
coast of the Java island.

West coast of Java
The following river flows toward the west coast of Java to the Sunda Strait.
Liman River

North coast of Java
The following rivers flow toward the north coast of Java to the Java Sea (from west to east).

North coast of Jakarta
The following rivers flow toward the north coast of Jakarta to the Java Sea (from west to east).

South coast of Java
The following rivers flow toward the south coast of Java to the Indian Ocean.

East coast of Java
The following river flows toward the east coast of Java to the Bali Strait.
Setail River

By Province

Banten

Central Java

East Java

Jakarta

West Java

Yogyakarta

See also
 List of rivers of Indonesia

References

 
Java